Jill Jones (born 1951) is a poet and writer from Sydney, Australia. She is a senior lecturer at the University of Adelaide.

In 1993 she won the Mary Gilmore Prize for her first book of poetry, The Mask and the Jagged Star (Hazard Press). Her third book, The Book of Possibilities (Hale & Iremonger), was published in 1997. It was shortlisted for the National Book Council 'Banjo' Awards and the Adelaide Festival Awards. Her fourth book, Screens, Jets, Heaven: New and Selected Poems, was published by Salt Publishing in 2002. It won the 2003 Kenneth Slessor Prize for Poetry (NSW Premier's Literary Awards). Her fifth full-length book, Broken/Open was published by Salt Publishing in 2005. It was shortlisted for The Age Poetry Book of the Year 2005 and the Kenneth Slessor Poetry Prize 2006. She served as a judge for the 1995 NSW Premier's Literary Awards and for the inaugural Broadway Poetry Prize in 2001. A History of What I'll Become was shortlisted for the 2021 Kenneth Slessor Prize for Poetry (NSW Premier's Literary Awards) and for the 2022 Adelaide Festival Awards for Literature John Bray Poetry Award.

Bibliography

Poetry 
Collections and chapbooks
 
 Flagging Down Time, Five Islands Press, Wollongong, 1993
 The Book of Possibilities, Hale and Iremonger, Sydney, 1997
 Screens Jets Heaven: New and Selected Poems, Salt Publishing, Cambridge, 2002
 Struggle and Radiance: Ten Commentaries, Wild Honey Press, Bray, 2004 (chapbook)
 Where the Sea Burns, Picaro Press, Warners Bay, 2004 (chapbook)
 Fold Unfold, Vagabond Press, Sydney, 2005 (chapbook)
 Broken/Open, Salt Publishing, Cambridge, 2005
 Romance of Death, Jill Jones, Melbourne, c2008
 Questions for Light, (Bruno Leti, illustrator), Bruno Leti, Carlton, Victoria, 2008
 Dark Bright Doors, Wakefield Press, Adelaide, 2010
 Ash is Here, So are Stars, Walleah Press, North Hobart, 2012
 The Beautiful Anxiety, Puncher & Wattmann, Glebe, NSW, 2014
 Breaking the Days, Whitmore Press, Geelong, 2015
 The Leaves Are My Sisters, Little Windows Press, Adelaide, 2016
 Brink, Five Islands Press, Melbourne, 2017
 Viva the Real, University of Queensland Press, St Lucia, Queensland, 2018
 A History of What I'll Become, UWA Publishing, Crawley, Western Australia, 2020
 Wild Curious Air, Recent Work Press, Canberra, 2020

Critical studies and reviews of Jones' work
Wild Curious Air

References

External links 
 Author weblog
 Author interview

1951 births
20th-century Australian poets
Living people
Poets from Sydney
Chapbook writers
21st-century Australian poets
Australian women poets
Academic staff of the University of Adelaide
21st-century Australian women writers
20th-century Australian women writers